Freeport, a variant of free port, may refer to:

Places

United States
Freeport, California
Freeport, Florida
Freeport, Illinois
Freeport, Indiana
Freeport, Iowa
Freeport, Kansas
Freeport, Maine
Freeport (CDP), Maine
Freeport, Michigan
Freeport, Minnesota
Freeport, New York
Freeport, Ohio
Freeport, Pennsylvania
Freeport, Texas
Freeport, West Virginia

Elsewhere
Freeport, Bahamas
Freeport, Nova Scotia, Canada
Freeport Tortuga, Haiti
Freeport, Trinidad and Tobago

Railway stations
Freeport (LIRR station), a Long Island Railroad Station in Freeport, New York, U.S.A.
Braintree Freeport railway station, a railway station in Braintree, Essex, England
Freeport station (Illinois), a proposed railway station in Freeport, Illinois, U.S.A.
Freeport station (Maine), an Amtrak station in Freeport, Maine, U.S.A.

Arts, entertainment, and media
 Freeport, name of several space stations in the video game Freelancer (2003)
 Freeport, a fictional town in the video game SiN (1998) 
 Freeport: The City of Adventure, a role playing game setting by Green Ronin Publishing

Other uses
Free port, a special economic zone
Freeport Doctrine, articulated by Stephen A. Douglas at the 1858 Lincoln–Douglas debate in Freeport, Illinois
Freeport-McMoRan, a mining company operating in the Americas, Spain and Indonesia